Scopula adelpharia is a moth of the family Geometridae. It was described by Püngeler in 1894. It is found in North Africa, the Near East and Middle East.

The larvae feed on Convolvulus  and Prosopis  species.

Subspecies
Scopula adelpharia adelpharia (Israel, Palestine)
Scopula adelpharia pharaonis Sterneck, 1933 (Egypt)

References

Moths described in 1894
adelpharia
Moths of Africa
Moths of Asia
Taxa named by Rudolf Püngeler